Chen Xiaoxin (born 24 April 1998) is a Chinese badminton player. Chen started playing badminton in 2006, and has won some junior international tournament includes the mixed team event at the 2014 World Junior Championships. She made her first senior international debut at the 2015 Indonesia Masters, and won her first senior title at the 2017 Swiss Open.

Achievements

BWF World Tour 
The BWF World Tour, which was announced on 19 March 2017 and implemented in 2018, is a series of elite badminton tournaments sanctioned by the Badminton World Federation (BWF). The BWF World Tour is divided into levels of World Tour Finals, Super 1000, Super 750, Super 500, Super 300 (part of the HSBC World Tour), and the BWF Tour Super 100.

Women's singles

BWF Grand Prix 
The BWF Grand Prix had two levels, the Grand Prix and Grand Prix Gold. It was a series of badminton tournaments sanctioned by the Badminton World Federation (BWF) and played between 2007 and 2017.

Women's singles

  BWF Grand Prix Gold tournament
  BWF Grand Prix tournament

References

External links 
 

1998 births
Living people
People from Nanning
Badminton players from Guangxi
Chinese female badminton players
21st-century Chinese women